Éider Orlando Arévalo Truque (born 9 March 1993) is a Colombian racewalker.

He competed in the 20 km walk at the 2012 Summer Olympics, where he placed 20th. He represented Colombia at the 2020 Summer Olympics.

Personal bests
10,000 m track walk: 39:56.01 min A –  Medellín, 24 September 2011
20,000 m track walk: 1:22:11.1 hrs (ht) –  Santiago, 15 March 2014
10 km road walk: 40:11 min –  Valley Cottage, NY, 14 September 2014
20 km road walk: 1:18:53 hrs NR –  London, 13 August 2017

International competitions

References

External links

 

Tilastopaja biography

1993 births
Living people
Sportspeople from Bogotá
Colombian male racewalkers
Olympic athletes of Colombia
Athletes (track and field) at the 2012 Summer Olympics
Athletes (track and field) at the 2016 Summer Olympics
Athletes (track and field) at the 2020 Summer Olympics
Athletes (track and field) at the 2010 Summer Youth Olympics
World Athletics Championships athletes for Colombia
World Athletics Championships medalists
South American Games gold medalists for Colombia
South American Games medalists in athletics
Central American and Caribbean Games gold medalists for Colombia
Competitors at the 2014 South American Games
Competitors at the 2014 Central American and Caribbean Games
Athletes (track and field) at the 2019 Pan American Games
Pan American Games competitors for Colombia
World Athletics Championships winners
Central American and Caribbean Games medalists in athletics
21st-century Colombian people